Tina Moore is the debut album by American R&B singer Tina Moore, originally released in 1995. It includes the singles "Color Me Blue", which reached number 73 on the US Hot R&B/Hip-Hop Songs, "All I Can Do", which reached number 48, and "Never Gonna Let You Go", which peaked at number 27.

The album was released in Europe in 1997 with two extra tracks, including the UK garage version of "Never Gonna Let You Go", which reached number seven on the UK Singles Chart. A remix of "Nobody Better" was also released as a single, reaching number 20 in the UK in 1998.

Track listing

Personnel
Adapted from AllMusic.

Tina Moore – primary artist, background vocals
Scott Ahaus – mixing
Paul D. Allen – assistant engineer, drums, keyboard programming, keyboards
Curtiss Boone – arranger, drum programming, keyboards
Johnny Buzzerio – photography
Irving Collier – background vocals
Tony Dawsey – mastering
M. Doc – producer
Kevin Evans – executive producer
Vernon D. Fails – keyboards, piano
Anthony Ferguson – executive producer
Tommie Ford – bass, drums, keyboards, mixing, producer
Doug Haverty – art direction
Gerey Johnson – drum programming, keyboard programming, mixing, producer
Ben Keys – assistant engineer
Jere Mc – guitar, producer
David McMurray	– saxophone
Clell Moore – assistant engineer
Ron Otis – drums
Robert Owens – background vocals
Michael J. Powell – arranger, drum programming, engineer, guitar, keyboard programming, keyboards, mixing, percussion, producer, rhythm arrangements
Paul Riser – string arrangements
Gerard Smerek – engineer, mixing
Al Turner – bass
Daniel Weatherspoon – piano
Mario Winans – drums

Charts

References

External links
Tina Moore at Discogs
Tina Moore (European version) at Discogs

1995 debut albums
RCA Records albums
Tina Moore albums
Scotti Brothers Records albums